The 1871 Westmorland by-election was fought on 21 February 1871.  The byelection was fought due to the 
incumbent Conservative MP, Thomas Taylor becoming Baron Kenlis and so losing his House of Commons seat due to his elevation to the House of Lords.  It was won by his son Thomas Taylor, who stood unopposed as the Conservative candidate.

References

1871 elections in the United Kingdom
1871 in England
19th century in Westmorland
History of Westmorland
By-elections to the Parliament of the United Kingdom in Cumbria constituencies
Unopposed by-elections to the Parliament of the United Kingdom in English constituencies
By-elections to the Parliament of the United Kingdom in Westmorland constituencies